Linha da Beira Baixa, originally called Caminho de Ferro da Beira Baixa, is a railway line which connects the stations of Entroncamento and Guarda in central Portugal. The first section, from Abrantes to Covilhã was opened on 6 September 1891. The line to Guarda was opened on 11 May 1893. At the time, only the section from Abrantes to Guarda was considered to be part of Linha da Beira Baixa, while the route from Entroncamento to Abrantes belonged to the Linha do Leste. Passenger service on the Guarda-Covilhã segment reopened on 2 May 2021 after it fell into disuse in 2009.

See also 
 List of railway lines in Portugal
 List of Portuguese locomotives and railcars
 History of rail transport in Portugal

References

Sources
 

Railway lines opened in 1891
Railway lines in Portugal
Iberian gauge railways